Peduzzi is a surname. Notable people with the surname include:

Anna Maria Peduzzi (1912–1979), Italian racing driver
Émile-Gustave Cavallo-Péduzzi (1851–1917), French painter
Renato Peduzzi (active 19th Century, died 1894), Italian sculptor
Richard Peduzzi (born 1943), French scenographer